Young, Gifted and Broke was a 1989 British sitcom series created by Laurence Marks and Maurice Gran, airing on ITV. The show stars Elena Ferrari, Cheryl Miller, Mark Monero, Jason Rush and Kate Emma Davies as five teenagers who are working at an electronics shop on a Youth Training Scheme. James Hazeldine plays their teacher Paul and Mary Healy plays Paul's wife Emma.

Only seven episodes were produced.

Cast
 Elena Ferrari as Tamsin
 James Hazeldine as Frank
 Cheryl Miller as Aysha
 Mark Monero as Adrian
 Simon O'Brien as Paul
 Steven O'Donnell as Bolton
 Jason Rush as Greg
 Mary Healy as Emma
 Kate Emma Davies as Lucy
 Bobby Bragg as Alan

Episodes

External links 
 
 

1989 British television series debuts
1989 British television series endings
1980s British sitcoms
ITV sitcoms
1980s British teen sitcoms
Television series by ITV Studios
English-language television shows
Television series about teenagers
Television shows produced by Central Independent Television
Television shows set in Birmingham, West Midlands